Lisa Gründing (born 2 December 1991) is a German volleyball player.

Career 
She played for TSV Burgdorf, and  SC Potsdam.
She participated in the 2018 FIVB Volleyball Women's Nations League. and 2019 Montreux Volley Masters.

References

External links 

 FIVB profile
 CEV profile

1991 births
Living people
German women's volleyball players
People from Burgwedel
Sportspeople from Lower Saxony